The 2018 Mississippi State Bulldogs football team represented Mississippi State University in the 2018 NCAA Division I FBS football season. The Bulldogs played their home games at Davis Wade Stadium in Starkville, Mississippi and competed in the Western Division of the Southeastern Conference (SEC). They were led by first-year head coach Joe Moorhead. Mississippi State subsequently vacated all eight victories due to NCAA sanctions due to academic misconduct involving 10 players and a tutor in online coursework.

Previous season
The Bulldogs finished the 2017 season 9–4, 4–4 in SEC play to finish in a tie for fourth  place in the Western Division. They were invited to the TaxSlayer Bowl where they beat Louisville.

Head coach Dan Mullen resigned at the end of last season to become the head coach at Florida. Running backs coach Greg Knox served as interim head coach for the TaxSlayer Bowl. On November 28, Penn State offensive coordinator Joe Moorhead was hired as their new head coach, beginning in the 2018 season.

Preseason

Award watch lists
Listed in the order that they were released

SEC media poll
The SEC media poll was released on July 20, 2018 with the Bulldogs predicted to finish in third place in the West Division.

Preseason All-SEC teams
The Bulldogs had five players selected to the preseason all-SEC teams.

Offense

3rd team

Nick Fitzgerald – QB

Aeris Williams – RB

Defense

1st team

Montez Sweat – DL

Jeffery Simmons – DL

3rd team

Mark McLaurin – DB

Schedule
All eight victories were subsequently vacated as part of NCAA sanctions due to academic misconduct involving a tutor and online coursework.

Schedule Source:

Rankings

Game summaries

Stephen F. Austin

at Kansas State

Mississippi State quarterback Nick Fitzgerald made his first appearance on the football fields since November 2017, when a foot injury sidelined him for the season and a 1-game suspension kept him out of the season opener.  Fitzgerald threw for 154 yards with two touchdowns and ran for another 159 yards.  Mississippi State compiled a total of 538 yards of total offense where Kansas State only managed 213.

Kansas State continued with its two-quarterback system, switching snaps between Skylar Thompson and Alex Delton. Kansas State running back Alex Barnes managed 75 yards rushing, but the Wildcats fell short to lose the game 31-10.

Louisiana

at Kentucky

Florida

Auburn

at LSU

Texas A&M

Louisiana Tech

at Alabama

Arkansas

at Ole Miss

vs. Iowa (Outback Bowl)

Players drafted into the NFL

References

Mississippi State
Mississippi State Bulldogs football seasons
Mississippi State Bulldogs football